Omid Reza Mir Sayafi (also Omidreza Mirsayafi; 1979/80 – March 18, 2009 in Evin Prison in Tehran) was an Iranian blogger and journalist.

Mir Sayafi was the first blogger to have died while in prison for his publication. Two other bloggers were killed afterward, and they are the Bahraini blogger Zakariya Rashid Hassan al-Ashiri, who was killed in April 2011 and Brazilian blogger Edinaldo Filgueira, who was killed June 2011.

Career
Mir Sayafi's blog is no longer accessible. But in the Wayback Machine there is an archive containing the blog posts that led to his imprisonment. Mir-Sayafi's main area of expertise was traditional Persian music. He also wrote poetry and penned articles for Persian-language electronic art journals. He was apparently well known in Iranian intelligentsia circles.

Death
In December 2008, Mir Sayafi was sentenced to two and half years in prison for allegedly insulting religious leaders  and engaging in propaganda against the Islamic Republic of Iran. When he died, Mir Sayafi was still awaiting an additional trial for insulting Islam.

Reactions
Some human rights groups that his death follows a pattern of Iranian authorities "denying urgent health care to prisoners of conscience, resulting in their death."

Impact
Several citizen media groups, such as the Committee to Protect Bloggers, have announced March 18 as the day of solidarity with persecuted bloggers. The March 18 Movement was created in his memory.

See also
Human rights in Iran

References

External links 
The March 18th Movement
GlobalVoices.org
Huffington Post
The Blog Herald
Jailed Iranian Blogger Dies - Rooz.online.com

2009 deaths
Iranian bloggers
Iranian journalists
Iranian people who died in prison custody
Journalists who died while in prison
Prisoners who died in Iranian detention
Year of birth uncertain